Keith Edward Lake (25 June 1951 – 23 February 2020) was an Australian rules footballer who played with Essendon in the Victorian Football League (VFL). Lake's brother, Bruce, also played VFL football for Essendon and Footscray. Lake spent six seasons with Essendon where he was in and out of the senior team. During that time, he won a reserves premiership in 1968, was named the club's most courageous player in 1970 and was awarded the reserves best and fairest in 1972. After leaving the Bombers, Lake played with Coburg in the Victorian Football Association (VFA), winning a premiership with them in his first year. He later moved to Queensland and played for Coorparoo and Southport, as well as representing Queensland.

Notes

External links 
		

Essendon Football Club past player profile

2020 deaths
1951 births
Australian rules footballers from Victoria (Australia)
Essendon Football Club players
Coburg Football Club players
Coorparoo Football Club players
Southport Australian Football Club players